Kath is both a given name (often a short form of Katherine, Kathleen, etc.) and a surname. Notable people with the name include:


Given name
 Katherine Kath Bloom, American singer-songwriter whose sad voice often accompanies simple folk melodies
 Kath Hughes, British actress and comedian
 Kathleen Kath Pettingill (born 1935), the matriarch of a notorious Melbourne based criminal family
 Kath Shelper, 21st century Australian film producer
 Katherine Kath Soucie, American voice actress

Surname
 Katherine Kath (1920–2012), French ballerina and actress
 Kory Kath (born 1977), American politician
 Roger Kath (born 1984), Hong Kong footballer
 Terry Kath (1946–1978), original guitarist, vocalist, and founding member of the band Chicago

Fictional characters
 Kath Day-Knight, in the Australian television comedy series Kath & Kim

See also
 Cath (disambiguation)

English-language feminine given names
Hypocorisms